Oliver Johnson may refer to:

Oliver Johnston (actor) (1888-1966), British actor
Oliver Johnson (drummer), jazz drummer, frequent collaborator of Takashi Kako
Oliver Johnson (runner), British runner; see 2011 World Long Distance Mountain Running Challenge

See also
Oliver Johnson's Woods Historic District, Indianapolis, Indiana, U.S.
Olive M. Johnson (1872–1952), American socialist, newspaper editor and political activist
Ollie Johnson (disambiguation)
Oliver Johnston (disambiguation)